Arivaca ostreella is a species of snout moth described by Émile Louis Ragonot in 1887. It is found in the US from southern Arizona through New Mexico to Texas.

The wingspan is about 25 mm. The cell on the forewings is brownish orange and the ground color is yellow or light orange posterior to the cell. The hindwings are light brown in both sexes. Adults are on wing in July.

References

Moths described in 1887
Anerastiini
Moths of North America